Honduras is scheduled to compete at the 2023 Pan American Games in Santiago, Chile from October 20 to November 5, 2023. This was Honduras's 13th appearance at the Pan American Games, having competed at every Games since 1975.

Competitors
The following is the list of number of competitors (per gender) participating at the games per sport/discipline.

Football

Men's tournament

Honduras qualified a men's team of 18 athletes after finishing as the top ranked Central American team at the 2022 CONCACAF U-20 Championship in the Dominican Republic.

Summary

Wrestling

Honduras qualified two wrestlers (Greco-Roman: 87 kg and 97 kg) through the 2022 Pan American Wrestling Championships held in Acapulco, Mexico.  

Men

See also
Honduras at the 2024 Summer Olympics

References

Nations at the 2023 Pan American Games
2023
2023 in Honduran sport